Albert Thomas McComb (27 September 1906 – 24 December 1981) was an Australian rules footballer who played with  and  in the Victorian Football League (VFL).

Family
The son of Edmund Kerr McComb (1873–1957) and Sarah Ann McComb, nee Bedford (1878–1973), Albert Thomas McComb was born at Frankston on 27 September 1906.

Football

Essendon
He played the first three games of the season but was then dropped.

Hawthorn

Frankston
McComb commenced the 1926 season with Hawthorn but was cleared back to Frankston without making a senior appearance.

Stawell
In 1927 he again commenced the season with Hawthorn but after failing to make the team was cleared to Stawell Football Club in June.

Hawthorn
McComb again returned to Hawthorn for the 1928 VFL season and he made a further 15 appearances over two seasons.

Frankston
He then returned to Frankston for the 1930 season where he both played and coached for several years.

Port Campbell
McComb was captain coach of Port Campbell from 1936 to 1939, leading them to premierships in his first two seasons with the club.

Later life
In 1941 Albert McComb married Enid Ethel Langham and they lived in Kew while he worked at the Australian Paper Mills in Fairfield. 

McComb also served in the Australian Army for 18 months during World War II.

After his retirement the McCombs moved to Frankston, where they lived until his death in 1981. Albert McComb is buried with his wife at Frankston Cemetery.

Notes

External links 

Essendon Football club profile

1906 births
1981 deaths
Australian rules footballers from Melbourne
Australian Rules footballers: place kick exponents
Frankston Bombers players
Essendon Football Club players
Hawthorn Football Club players
Stawell Football Club players
Australian Army personnel of World War II
Military personnel from Melbourne
People from Frankston, Victoria